Computational human phantoms are models of the human body used in computerized analysis. Since the 1960s, the radiological science community has developed and applied these models for ionizing radiation dosimetry studies. These models have become increasingly accurate with respect to the internal structure of the human body.

As computing evolved, so did the phantoms. Graduating from phantoms based on simple quadratic equations to voxelized phantoms, which were based on actual medical images of the human body, was a major step. The newest models are based on more advanced mathematics, such as non-uniform rational B-spline (NURBS) and polygon meshes, which allow for 4-D phantoms where simulations can take place not only 3-dimensional space but in time as well.

Phantoms have been developed for a wide variety of humans, from children to adolescents to adults, male and female, as well as pregnant women. With such a variety of phantoms, many kinds of simulations can be run, from dose received from medical imaging procedures to nuclear medicine. Over the years, the results of these simulations have created an assortment of standards that have been adopted in the International Commission on Radiological Protection (ICRP) recommendations.

Stylized (first-generation) computational phantoms

The very first generation computational phantoms were developed to address the need to better assess organ doses from internally deposited radioactive materials in workers and patients.  Until the late 1950s, the ICRP still used very simple models. In these calculations, each organ of the body was assumed to be represented as a sphere with an "effective radius". The radionuclide of interest was assumed to be located at the center of the sphere and the "effective absorbed energy" was calculated for each organ. Phantoms such as the Shepp-Logan Phantom were used as models of a human head in the development and testing of image reconstruction algorithms. However, scientists attempted to model individual organs of the body and ultimately the entire human body in a realistic manner, the efforts of which led to stylized anthropomorphic phantoms that resemble the human anatomy.

In general, stylized computational phantom is a mathematical representation of the human body which, when coupled with a Monte Carlo radiation transport computer code, can be used to track the radiation interactions and energy deposition in the body. The feature of stylized computational phantom is finely tuned by adjusting individual parameters of the mathematical equations, which describes the volume, position, and shape of individual organs. Stylized computational phantom has a long history of development through the 1960s to 1980s.

MIRD phantom

The MIRD phantom was developed by Fisher and Snyder at Oak Ridge National Laboratory (ORNL) in the 1960s with 22 internal organs and more than 100 sub-regions. It is the first anthropomorphic phantom representing a hermaphrodite adult for internal dosimetry.

Phantoms derived from MIRD

Based on MIRD phantom, many derivations of phantoms were developed for the following decades. The major types of phantom include: stylized "Family" phantom series developed in the 1980s by Cristy and Eckerman; "ADAM and EVA" developed by GSF, Germany; CAM (Computerized Anatomical Man) phantom developed by NASA unknown by the mainstream radiation protection dosimetry community, etc.

Limitation on stylized phantom

Although many efforts were undertaken to diversify and extend its applications in radiation protection, radiation therapy, and medical imaging, one cannot overcome its inborn limitation. The representation of internal organs in this mathematical phantom was crude, by capturing only the most general description of the position and geometry of each organ. With the powerful computer and tomographic imaging technologies became available in the late 1980s, the history launched a new era of voxel phantoms.

Voxel (second-generation) phantoms

The stylized phantoms provided only basic information with a large degree of error.  More accurate methods of simulating a human body were necessary to advance.  To allow further research, the computer technology had to become more powerful and more readily available.  This did not occur until the 1980s.  The real breakthrough occurred when computed tomography (CT) and magnetic resonance imaging (MRI) devices could generate highly accurate images of internal organs in three dimensions and in digital format.  Researchers discovered that they could take that diagnostic data and transform it into a voxel (volumetric pixel) format, essentially re-creating the human body in digital form in 3D.  Today there are over 38 human phantoms in voxel format, for many different uses.

Challenges for implementation

Two major issues with development of the reference phantoms are difficulty in obtaining useful images and handling the large amount of data created from these images.  CT scans give the human body a large dose of ionizing radiation – something the computational phantom was designed to circumvent in the first place.  MRI images take a long time to process.  Furthermore, most scans of a single subject cover only a small portion of the body, whereas a full scan series is needed for useful data.  Handling this data is also difficult.  While the newer computers had hard drives large enough to store the data, the memory requirements for processing the images to the desired voxel size were often too steep.

Basic development process of a voxel phantom

While there have been many voxel phantoms developed, they have all followed a similar path to completion.  First, they must obtain the raw data, from CT scans, MRI imaging, or direct imaging through photography.  Second, the components of the body must be segmented, or identified and separated from the rest. Third, the density of each component must be identified, along with the composition of each. Lastly, the data must be unified into a single 3D structure so it may be used for analysis.

Early developments

The earliest work on voxelized phantoms occurred independently at about the same time by Dr. Gibbs, of Vanderbilt University, and Dr. Zankl at the National Research Center for Environment and Health (GSF) in Germany. This occurred about 1982.  Dr. Gibb's work started with X-ray images, not CT or MRI images, for the reconstruction of a human phantom which was used for medical dose simulations. M. Zankl and team did use CT imaging to create 12 phantoms, ranging from BABY to VISIBLE HUMAN.

Advancements in voxel phantom design by country

 United States
 Dr. Zubal and team at Yale University developed the VoxelMan phantom in 1994. This original phantom was complete only from head-to-torso, and was designed specifically for improving nuclear medicine. Since its initial development it has been improved to include arms and legs to represent a complete human body, and a dedicated head has been completed which delineates the small internal sub-structures of the brain.
 In 2000, Dr. George Xu and two students at Rensselaer Polytechnic Institute (RPI) created the VIP-Man phantom from data retrieved from the National Library of Medicine's (NLM) Visible Human Project (VHP). This phantom was the most complex model to date, with over 3.7 billion voxels. This model was used in many studies concerning health physics and medical physics.
 Dr. Bolch and team at the University of Florida created a set of pediatric phantoms from 2002 to 2006. Child computational phantoms had been severely underrepresented until this point. The team developed models ranging from newborn to mid-teens.
 The U.S. Food and Drug Administration (FDA) developed voxel-based virtual family body phantoms  for X-ray dose study. Dr. Gu and Dr. Kyprianou improved the heart parts with male/female high-resolution computational heart phantoms (both voxel/mesh based) in 2011. The main contribution is that the detail level of coronary arteries are visible in those phantoms.
 Brazil
 Dr. Kramer in Brazil improved on the data from the Yale Zubal team in an attempt to create a phantom similar to International Commission on Radiological Protection requirements, and created the MAX phantom.
 United Kingdom
 The NORMAN phantom was developed by a team led by Dr. Dimbylow. This was created by analyzing magnetic resonance images of a human male in 1996.  In 2005, the team created a female phantom.
 Australia
 At Flinders University, Dr. Caon and team created a torso phantom to simulate a teenage girl in 1999. The name of the phantom was ADELAIDE.  This was the only teenage female phantom for a number of years.
 Japan
 The first Asian phantom was developed by Dr. Saito and team at the Japan Atomic Energy Research Institute (JAERI) in 2001. This was primarily used for radiation dosimetry studies.
 Another group, led by Dr. Nagaoka at the National Institute of Information and Communications Technology (NIICT), created a male and female phantom around the same time period as the JAERI group. These were created from MR images.
 Korea
 Many computational phantoms have been created in Korea since 2004 by Drs. Lee and Kim. Both male and female phantoms have been created.  The High-Definition Reference Korean (HDRK) was created by color pictures of a cadaver, similar to the construction of the VIP-Man phantom from RPI.
 China
 In the mid-2000s, the Chinese government authorized the creation of their own version of the VHP. The data was used by Dr. Zhang and team at the China Institute for Radiation Protection to create the CNMAN phantom, the most accurate computational phantom to date.
Germany
 M. Zankl and co-workers used CT images to construct a variety of individual voxel phantoms, including three paediatric ones and a woman in the 24th week of pregnancy.

Recent developments

Statistical phantom

A computational framework was presented, based on statistical shape modelling, for construction of race-specific organ models for internal radionuclide dosimetry and other nuclear-medicine applications. The proposed technique used to create the race-specific statistical phantom maintains anatomic realism and provides the statistical parameters for application to radionuclide dosimetry.

Boundary representation (third-generation) phantom

Boundary representation (BREP) phantoms are computational human models that contain exterior and interior anatomical features of a human body using boundary representation method. In the realm of health and medical physics they are primarily used for ionizing radiation dosimetry.

In the development of computational human phantoms, of particular interest is the concept of a "deformable" phantom whose geometry can be conveniently transformed to fit particular physical organ shapes, volumes, or body postures. Design of this type of phantom is realized by Non-Uniform Rational B-Spline (NURBS) method or polygonal mesh method, which are usually collectively called BREP methods. Compared to the voxel phantoms, BREP phantoms are better suited for geometry deformation and adjustment,  because a larger set of computerized operations are available, such as extrusion, chamfering, blending, drafting, shelling and tweaking. A major advantage of BREP phantoms is their ability to morph into an existing reference phantom or into the anatomy of a real worker or patient, which makes individual-specific dose calculation possible.

NURBS-based phantom

Surfaces of a non-uniform rational B-spline (NURBS)-based phantom are defined by NURBS equations which are formulated by a set of control points. The shape and volume of a NURBS surface vary with the coordinates of control points. This feature is useful in designing a time-dependent 4D human body modeling.  An example is given by NCAT phantoms by Segars et al., which is used to simulate cardiac and respiratory motions with more realistic modeling of the cardiac system.

Polygonal mesh-based phantom

A polygonal mesh is composed of a set of vertices, edges, and faces that specify the shape of a polyhedral object in 3D space. The surfaces of the phantom are defined by a large amount of polygonal meshes, most commonly triangles. The polygonal mesh has three remarkable advantages in developing whole-body phantoms. Firstly, mesh surfaces depicting human anatomy can be conveniently obtained from real patient images or commercial human anatomy mesh models. Secondly, the polygonal mesh-based phantom has considerable flexibility in adjusting and fine-tuning its geometry, allowing the simulation of very complex anatomies. Thirdly, many commercial computer aided design (CAD) software, such as Rhinoceros, AutoCAD, Visualization Toolkit (VTK), provide built-in functions able to rapidly convert polygonal mesh into NURBS.

Development

Segars was the precursor of applying NURBS to phantom design. In 2001 his doctoral thesis described the method of developing a dynamic NURBS-based cardiac-torso (NCAT) phantom in detail. The phantom has a 4D beating heart model which was derived from 4D tagged (MRI) data. The remaining organs in the torso of the phantom were designed based on the Visible Human Project CT data set and were composed of 3D NURBS surfaces. Respiratory motion was also incorporated into this phantom.

In 2005, Xu et al. at Rensselaer Polytechnic Institute used the 3D VIP-Man phantom to simulate respiratory motions by adopting the gated respiratory motion data of the NCAT phantom. The 4D VIP-Man Chest phantom was used to study external-beam treatment planning for a lung cancer patient. In 2007, Xu's research group reported creation of a series of polygon-based phantoms representing a pregnant woman and her fetus at the end of 3, 6, and 9 month gestations (RPI Pregnant Females). The mesh data were initially obtained from separate anatomical information sources including a non-pregnant female, a 7-month pregnant woman CT data set, and a mesh model of the fetus. In 2008, two triangular mesh-based phantoms were created, named as RPI Deformable Adult Male and Female (RPI-AM, RPI-FM). The anatomic parameters of the phantoms were made consistent with two datasets: the mass and density of internal organs originated from ICRP-23 and ICRP-89, and the whole-body height and weight percentile data were obtained from the National Health and Nutrition Examination Survey (NHANES 1999–2002). Later on, to study the relationship between breast size and lung dosimetry, a new group of phantoms were produced by altering the breast geometry of RPI-AF.

From 2006 to 2009, researchers at the University of Florida designed a total of twelve "hybrid" male and female phantoms, representing newborn, 1-, 5-, 10-, and 15-year-old and adult male/females. The phantoms are addressed as "hybrid" because most organs and tissues were modeled by NURBS surfaces whereas the skeleton, brain and extra-thoracic airways were modeled by polygonal surfaces. Anatomic parameters of the phantoms were adjusted to match 4 reference datasets, i.e., standard anthropometric data, reference organ masses from ICRP Publication 89, reference elemental compositions provided in ICRP 89 as well as ICRU Report 46, and reference data on the alimentary tract organs given in ICRP Publications 89 and 100.

In 2008, researchers at Vanderbilt University, in collaboration with researchers from Duke University, developed a family of adult and pediatric phantoms by adapting the NURBS-based NCAT adult male and female phantoms. ICRP-89 reference body and organ values were used to adjust NURBS surfaces.

In 2009 Cassola et al. at the Federal University of Pernambuco, Brazil, developed a pair of polygonal mesh-based phantoms in standing posture, FASH (Female Adult meSH) and MASH (Male Adult meSH). The methodology is very similar but not entirely identical to the one implemented in the designing of RPI-AM and RPI-FM.

In 2010, based on existing RPI-AM, researchers at RPI continued to create 5 more phantoms with different body mass index (BMI) ranging from 23 to 44 kg∙m-2. These phantoms are used to study the correlation between BMI and organ doses resulting from CT and positron emission tomography (PET) examinations.
	
In 2011 researchers at Hanyang University, Korea, reported a polygon-surface reference Korean male phantom (PSRK-Man). This phantom was constructed by converting the Visible Korean Human-Man (VKH-man) into a polygonal mesh-based phantom. The height, weight, geometry of organs and tissues were adjusted to match the Reference Korean data. Without voxelization the PSRK-man could be directly implemented in Geant4 Monte Carlo simulation using a built-in function, but the computation time was 70~150 times longer than that required by High Definition Reference Korean-Man (HDRK-Man), a voxelized phantom derived also from VKH-man.

In 2012, researchers at RPI developed the Computational Human for Animated Dosimetry (CHAD) phantom, structured such that its posture could be adjusted in conjunction with data obtained using a motion capture system. This phantom can be used to simulate the movement of a worker involved in an occupational of nuclear accident scenario, allowing researchers to gain an understanding of the impact of changing posture in the course of worker movement on radiation dose.

See also
Imaging phantom

References

External links
List of computational human phantoms
Consortium of Computational Human Phantoms (CCHP)
Rensselaer Radiation Measurement and Dosimetry Group
Helmholtz Zentrum München, Department of Radiation Sciences, Research Unit Medical Radiation Physics and Diagnostics

Radiology
Medical imaging
Radiation protection